Pavel Kučera is the name of:

Pavel Kučera (footballer), Czech footballer
Pavel Kučera (lawyer), Czech lawyer